Çıraqlı or Chirakhly or Chyrakhly or Chyakhly or Chiragly may refer to:
Çıraqlı, Dashkasan, Azerbaijan
Çıraqlı, Lachin, Azerbaijan
Çıraqlı, Shamakhi, Azerbaijan
Çıraxlı, Agdam, Azerbaijan